Horrabridge is a village in West Devon, England with a population of 2,115 people in 2006, down from 2,204 in 1991. Horrabridge is a major part of Walkham electoral ward. The population at the 2011 census was 3,115.

It sits on the River Walkham, a fishing river famous for its salmon. The village's name may have been taken from the 15th century pack-horse bridge which remains the only vehicular route from one side of the village to the other, and featured in the children's television programme Bagpuss. The bridge is a Grade I listed building.

Horrabridge has two pubs the London Inn and The Leaping Salmon but has lost many of its shops over the last 20 years including a draper, television shop and a general store. The village does however retain its post office, family bakery, hairdresser, florist and newsagent.

Until the beginning of the 20th century, the main industry was the mining of copper and tin. This industry has completely disappeared, leaving a legacy of unmapped mineshafts in the village and the surrounding area. It is a popular starting point for walks on Dartmoor and has become a dormitory village for the adjoining towns.

Horrabridge has a football club associated with it; Horrabridge Rangers Sports Association. The football club has 2 adult teams and 20 youth teams of boys and girls. The football club has been around for over 100 years and provides a useful activity for the children of Horrabridge and the surrounding villages of Yelverton, Buckland Monachorum, Crapstone, Meavy and Walkhampton.

Musician Seth Lakeman recorded his album Kitty Jay in Horrabridge. 

Horrabridge is twinned with Tilly-sur-Seulles in Normandy and the Twinning Association has existed since 1974.

References

External links

Bagpuss Opening Credits

Villages in Devon
Dartmoor